The International Johannes Brahms Competition ("Brahms Competition") is an international competition for the performers of piano, violin, viola, cello, chamber music, and singers.

The competition has taken place annually since 1993. The event is held in Pörtschach am Wörthersee, Austria, where Johannes Brahms occasionally stayed during the summer.

In each category, competitors are obliged to perform works composed by Brahms, either in the preliminary or final round.

Prize winners

See also

References

External links 
 
 Results 2001–2017

Violin competitions
Piano competitions
Singing competitions
Johannes Brahms